is a Japanese stage and film actor.

He began work with the Tokyo Sunshine Boys in 1983, and since then has performed in a variety of roles mostly in television dramas.

Filmography

Film
The Uchōten Hotel (2006)
The Magic Hour (2008)
The Kiyosu Conference (2013), Takigawa Kazumasu
Galaxy Turnpike (2015), Captain Tchiyama
Fukushima 50 (2020)

Television
Gokusen (2002), Kozo Wakamatsu
Gokusen 2 (2005), Kozo Wakamatsu
Gal Circle (2006), George
Gokusen 3 (2008), Kozo Wakamatsu
Wagaya no Rekishi (2010), Manager of Nagayouru
Sanada Maru (2016), Chōsokabe Morichika
The 13 Lords of the Shogun (2022), Doi Sanehira

References

External links
 Official Page 
 profile page 

1962 births
Japanese male actors
Living people
People from Ōita Prefecture